The Russian Gepard-class frigates, Russian designation Project 11661, is a class of frigates that were intended as successors to the earlier s and , and  corvettes. The first unit of the class, Yastreb (Hawk), was laid down at the Zelenodol'sk Zavod shipyard at Tatarstan in 1991. She was launched in July 1993, after which she began fitting out; fitting was nearly completed by late 1995, when it was suspended due to lack of funds. Renamed Tatarstan, the ship was finally completed in July 2002, and became the flagship of the Caspian Flotilla. She has two sister ships, Albatross (renamed Dagestan), and Burevestnik (Storm Petrel), which was still under construction .

The foreign customer Vietnam is the main operator of the class when its navy has commissioned at least 4 frigates - twice the size of Russia's Project 11661 frigates - while having plans to order at least 2 more.

Design
These vessels are capable of employing their weapons systems in conditions up to Sea State 5. The hull and superstructure are constructed primarily of steel, with some aluminium-magnesium being used in the upper superstructure. They are equipped with fin stabilizers and twin rudders, and can use either gas turbines or diesel for propulsion in a CODOG configuration.

Gepard is Russian for cheetah.

Service history
In October 2015, Dagestan, in company with three other Russian Navy ships serving with the Caspian Flotilla, launched cruise missiles at targets in Syria. Peshmerga forces (Kurdish armed forces located in northern Iraq) published a video allegedly depicting two cruise missiles mid-flight en route to Syria.

Export

The Gepard-class was designed from the outset as a lightweight, inexpensive export vessel. Russia offers three variants of the class to the market:
Gepard 3.9: designed to search, track and fight against surface, underwater and air enemy independently and within task force, plant mine fields, provide protection and patrol of maritime state border and exclusive economic zone, perform combat missions, patrol service. Powered by gas-turbine engines with CODOG configuration. Fitted with two inclined quadruple launchers for eight Kh-35 anti-ship missiles with alternative options to be featured with VLS systems such as UKSK (for cruise missiles such as Club-N and Yakhont) and Shtil-1 air-defense system. Being the only exported variant with Vietnam being its first and only operator.
Gepard 5.1: configured as a ocean-going patrol ship. Intended for patrolling territorial waters, helping in distress on the sea, environment protection, support to marine missions and flag demonstration in areas being of state interest. Can be featured with "heavier" weapons if necessary. Powered entirely by diesel engines with a two-shaft CODAD propulsion plant.
Gepard 5.3: designed to search, track and fight against surface, underwater and air enemy independently and within task force, carry out convoy missions and patrol duty, guard maritime state border and economic zone. Featured with four quadruple launchers for sixteen Kh-35 anti-ship missiles. Powered by a two-shaft CODAD propulsion plant.

Vietnam 
In March and August of 2011, the Vietnam People's Navy received two Gepard 3.9-class frigates ordered in 2006, built in Russia at Tatarstan's Gorky Shipbuilding Plant. In late 2011, Vietnam signed a contract for an additional batch of two ships in an anti-submarine configuration. A further two ships are being considered to bring the total order up to six vessels, and that potential acquisition is likely being stalled due to sanctions towards Russia as a result of the Ukrainian conflicts.

Sri Lanka 
Sri Lanka began talks for the credit purchase of a Gepard 5.1 frigate in 2017 and the Sri Lankan cabinet approved the proposal by President Maithripala Sirisena for the purchase of the ship in September 2017.

Ships

See also
 List of ships of the Soviet Navy
 List of ships of Russia by project number
 List of naval ship classes in service

References

External links
 Project 11661 Gepard Class Frigates @ Zelenodolsk Plant named after A.M. Gorky
 Project 11661 Gepard-3.9 Class Frigates @ Zelenodolsk Plant named after A.M. Gorky
 Project 11661 Gepard Class Frigates @ Naval Technology
 Project 1166.1 Gepard class @ FAS
 1166.1 Gepard @ Encyclopedia of Ships 
 All Gepard Class Frigates - Complete Ship List @ RussianShips 

Frigate classes